Ethel Houston  (19 April 1924 – 30 November 2017) was a solicitor, Enigma code breaker, and the first woman to become senior partner at a Scottish law firm.  She served on the Law Society's Council between 1975 and 1981, one of the first women to hold the position.  She also served on the Royal Commission on Legal Services in Scotland, and the Commission for Racial Equality.

Early life and education 
Houston was born in Albacete, Spain, in 1924 to Christian Brethren parents who worked as missionaries in the country.  Her mother was also called Ethel.  Houston had two siblings, including an elder brother James.

Houston's parents moved to Edinburgh in 1931, and sent her to James Gillespie's High School for girls.  She later attended Skerry's College, and at the encouragement of her father fitted two years of work into three months, in order to pass entrance exams to the University of Edinburgh.

In 1940, and at the age of 16, Houston entered the University of Edinburgh, along with her elder brother James.  Following her graduation with an MA in 1943, she applied for a Bachelor of Laws, whilst undertaking an apprenticeship at Balfour & Manson.  However, she was soon called up for military service, the University having alerted the military to her suitability.

Career 
She was one of the first recruits to Bletchley Park and worked in Hut 6 during the final year of World War Two. Under Gordon Welchman's command, Houston worked to improve Alan Turing's Bombe machine and compiled lists of messages used to create its menus.  After being demobbed, she returned to University, and in 1947 became a solicitor.

In 1949, Houston was made partner of Scottish law firm Balfour and Manson.  She was one of only four partners at the firm, and the first woman to be made senior partner at a Scottish firm.

In 1981, she was awarded an OBE, and in 2009, honorary membership of the Law Society.

Death and legacy 
Houston died in Edinburgh, aged 93 and is survived by nieces and nephews. She was described in her obituary as a “non-conformist, feisty and a fiercely independent thinker”.

References 

1924 births
2017 deaths
People from Albacete
Bletchley Park women
British expatriates in Spain
Officers of the Order of the British Empire
Alumni of the University of Edinburgh
Scottish solicitors
Foreign Office personnel of World War II